S450 may refer to :
 Canon S450, a Canon S Series digital camera
 PV-S450, a Casio Pocket viewer model